Rainbow's End is a 1935 American Western film directed by Norval Spencer and starring Hoot Gibson.

Cast 
Hoot Gibson as Neil Gibson Jr.
June Gale as Ann Ware
Oscar Apfel as Neil Gibson Sr.
Ada Ince as Gwen Gibson
John Elliott as Adam Ware
Henry Roquemore as Joe Williams
Jerry Mandy as Ranch Cook
Charles Hill as Bert Randall
Warner Richmond as Thomas Stark
Buddy Roosevelt as "Butch", Henchman
Stanley Blystone as Dorgan, Ranch Foreman
Fred Gilman as George Wright, Bookkeeper
John Ince as Rodeo Judge

External links 

1935 films
1935 Western (genre) films
American black-and-white films
American Western (genre) films
1930s English-language films
1930s American films